Alessandro Di Benedetto is an Italian-French sailor born on 5 January 1981 in Rome, Italy.

He is known for his solo sailings of the Atlantic (2002) and Pacific (2006) on sports catamarans (5.96 m), and for his solo, non-stop and unassisted round-the-world trip on a 6.50-metre Mini sailboat (2009-2010) and his participation in the 2012-2013 Vendee Globe finishing 11th.

Personal life
He is a geologist by training and a graduate from the University of Palermo in Italy.

Gallery

Publications
 My adventure on Everest sailing. The Vendée Globe, 2013.
 Around the world on a 6.50 metre sailboat, Auto-edition, 2010.
 TANDOKU, Publisher: MAGENES, Milan, 2007.
 Oltre l'Oceano, Publisher: MAGENES, Milan, 2006.
 L'Atlantico senza riparo, Publisher: NUTRIMENTI, Rome, Italy, 2004.
 Solo: The Incredible Crossing, Marine Anchor Editions, Louviers (France), 2004

References

External links
 Official Website

IMOCA 60 class sailors

1981 births
Living people
French male sailors (sport)
Italian male sailors (sport)
Sportspeople from Rome
French Vendee Globe sailors
Italian Vendee Globe sailors
2012 Vendee Globe sailors
Vendée Globe finishers
Single-handed circumnavigating sailors